Junior Miller may refer to:

Junior Miller, player for the Atlanta Falcons and New Orleans Saints 
Junior Miller (broadcaster), Dallas sports talk radio host on KTCK (AM)/KTCK-FM